The 2023 Dakar Rally is a rally raid event held in Saudi Arabia and the 45th edition of the Dakar Rally organized by Amaury Sport Organisation (ASO). The event takes place between 31 December 2022 and 15 January 2023. This is be the fourth time Saudi Arabia has hosted the event. For the second year running, the event is also the first round of the 2023 World Rally-Raid Championship.

The outline of the race route was presented on 5 June 2022. The route was started at a "Sea Camp" near Yanbu, on the Red Sea shore, and will finish in Dammam, at a Persian Gulf shore. The route returns to the Empty Quarter this year with three stages, including the marathon stage. The route will feature 70% new tracks, less liaison, and 5,000 kilometres of special stages. The route, details of which were revealed in November, has been described as longer, more difficult and with more dunes.

Timeline
 6 June – 31 October 2022: Registrations
 28–30 November 2022: Administrative checks at Circuit Paul Ricard
 27–28 December 2022: Arrivals at Saudi Arabia
 31 December 2022: Starting podium and the Prologue Stage
 1 January 2023: Race start
 15 January 2023: Race finish

Changes
Some changes were announced for this year's event:

 Digital roadbooks for all participants, including the bikes
 Time bonuses for bikes opening the stage
 "Mirror routes" - in order to separate the routes some stages will be split into "A and B routes", which feature different waypoints, assigned randomly
 No neutralizations for T1 and T2 categories - the stage will not have breaks in the middle
 Stage start procedure - the first truck to leave will be from 45th place. No reclassification for top 40 drivers
 Dakar Classic will follow dedicated route with 13 stages, including 2 marathon. New average speed group for less powerful vehicles 
 Introduction of "synthetic and bio fuels", with expectation that elite drivers will compete in low emission prototypes by 2026

Entry list 

On 10 November 2022 ASO announced the list of competitors.

In the truck category, the Kamaz and MAZ factory teams - two of the most dominant teams in the category - elected not to enter the 2023 Dakar Rally due to complaints that the FIA would force them to condemn the Russian invasion of Ukraine to enter. The two teams are based in Russia and Belarus, respectively.

Number of entries

Vehicles and Categories

Competitor list

  – The "Dakar Legends" - competitors that participated in 10 or more Dakar events.  – The first time starters - "rookies".  – Competitors that were not able to start the race. – Competitors participating in "Original by Motul" — limited assistance marathon class.

Withdrawals before the start:
 23 Konrad Dąbrowski - Appendicitis
 78 Ali Oukerbouch
 92 Ignacio Sanchis - Crashed in Shakedown, broke his clavicula

  – The "Dakar Legends" - competitors that participated in 10 or more Dakar events.  – The first time starters - "rookies".  – Competitors that were not able to start the race. – Competitors participating in "Original by Motul" — limited assistance marathon class.

Withdrawals before the start:
 168 Julio Estanguet

  – The "Dakar Legends" - competitors that participated in 10 or more Dakar events.  – The first time starters - "rookies".  – Competitors that were not able to start the race.

Withdrawals before the start:
 226 Antanas Juknevičius / Didzis Zariņš
 249 Mohamad Altwijri / Yasser Alhajjaj
 257 Koen Wauters / Pascal Feryn - issue at scrutiny
260 Abdulaziz Alyaeesh
 268 Tom De Leeuw / Cedric Feryn - issue at scrutiny
 271 Gurbanberdi Danatarow / Didar Orazmedow
 272 Hydyrberdi Abduhrahmanov / Muhammetmyrat Gurbanov

  – The "Dakar Legends" - competitors that participated in 10 or more Dakar events.  – The first time starters - "rookies".  – Competitors that were not able to start the race.

  – The "Dakar Legends" - competitors that participated in 10 or more Dakar events.  – The first time starters - "rookies".  – Late entries.  – Competitors that were not able to start the race.

Withdrawals before the start: 
 404 moved to T3 - 335
 426 Emilija Gelažninkienė / Arūnas Gelažninkas
 445 moved to T3 - 348

  – The "Dakar Legends" - competitors that participated in 10 or more Dakar events.  – The first time starters - "rookies".  – Late entries.  – Competitors that were not able to start the race.

Withdrawals before the start: 
 556 Yann Pellegrin / Arnaud Ayala

  – The "Dakar Legends" - competitors that participated in 10 or more Dakar events.  – The first time starters - "rookies".  – Competitors that were not able to start the race.

Notes

Stages 

 Stage 3 was neutralized after 377 kilometers for all 4-wheel vehicles due to severe weather.
 Due to flooding from the rain on January 3, a bivouac could not be established on time at Ad Dawadimi, prompting organizers to make route changes for stages 6–8. Stage 6 from Ha'il to Ad Dawadimi was reduced by roughly 100 kilometers, following which competitors would travel to a bivouac in Riyadh. The route from Ad Dawadimi to Riyadh originally scheduled to be stage 8 was moved up one day to become stage 7, while the original stage 7 route was moved to become stage 8. With the stage changes, stage 7 effectively became a "marathon" stage, where competitors are prohibited from receiving assistance from their teams during the overnight bivouac. Additionally, stage 7 was cancelled for the bikes and quads classes due to concerns for rider safety.

Stage winners

Stage results

Bikes

Quads

Cars

Light Prototypes (T3)

SSVs (T4)

Trucks

Classics

Final standings

Bikes

Quads

Original by Motul
The Original by Motul class, also known as the Malle Moto class, refers to bikes and quads competitors competing without any kind of assistance. The organizers provide 1 trunk per competitor for storage of the personal belongings, spare parts and tools. Competitors are only allowed to bring 1 headlight, 1 set of wheels, 1 set of tyres, 1 tent with sleeping bag and mattress, 1 travel bag and 1x 25 liter (6.6 gallon) backpack. Organizers allow free use of the generators, compressors and tool-boxes in the bivouac.

Cars

Light Prototypes

SSVs

Trucks

Classics

Incidents 
Stage 1. Previous year bike winner Sam Sunderland suffered an accident at the 52nd kilometer of the stage and was airlifted to Yanbu hospital with a concussion and a fractured shoulder.

Motorcyclist Bradley Cox suffered a broken elbow in an accident, forcing him to withdraw.

Michel Kremer and Thomas de Bois in the car category suffered a fuel leak, which caused the car to catch fire and burn beyond repair. The driver and the co-driver were unharmed.

Stage 3. Ricky Brabec suffered an accident at the 274th kilometer of the stage and was attended by the medical team. Brabec was transported to hospital after complaining of neck pain, ending his rally.

Stage 4. Joaquim Rodrigues suffered a fall at roughly the 90 kilometer mark of the stage and was taken to hospital in Ha’il with a broken left femur.

Lithuanian driver Benediktas Vanagas was airlifted from the stage after an accident after displaying concussion-like symptoms.

Stage 6. Audi teammates Carlos Sainz and Stéphane Peterhansel crashed in separate incidents at the same spot during kilometer 212 of the stage. Peterhansel's co-driver Édouard Boulanger suffered a broken vertebra in their accident, forcing their withdrawal from the rally.

Stage 7. Dutch driver Erik van Loon suffered a roll 99 kilometers into the stage. Van Loon was airlifted to hospital after he briefly lost consciousness and complained of neck pain after the wreck.

Stage 9. During the stage, Livio Sassinotti, an Italian spectator, died after being involved in an incident with Aleš Loprais' truck on a sand dune. Sassinotti was airlifted from the scene, but perished before reaching a hospital.  The incident marked the fourth consecutive year that the Dakar Rally had seen a fatality. Loprais, who was the leader of the Truck category at the time, had to miss Stage 10 pending a police investigation, and abandoned the rally.

Spanish motorcyclist Joan Barreda suffered an accident 16 kilometers into the stage. Barreda was airlifted to a hospital with a fractured vertebra, forcing his withdrawal from the rally.

Spanish driver Carlos Sainz suffered an accident roughly six kilometers into the stage. Sainz initially was evacuated by helicopter due to back and neck pain, but requested the helicopter turn around mid-flight so that he could return to the car and try to finish the rally. Sainz managed to return the car to the bivouac, but was forced to withdraw after finding the car was too badly damaged to be repaired.

References

External links

Dakar Rally
Saudi Arabia sport-related lists
Dakar
Dakar
Dakar Rally
Dakar Rally